The seventh season of the American animated comedy television series Regular Show, created by J. G. Quintel, originally aired on Cartoon Network in the United States, and was produced by Cartoon Network Studios. Quintel created the series' pilot using characters from his comedy shorts for the canceled anthology series The Cartoonstitute. He developed Regular Show from his own experiences in college. Simultaneously, several of the show's main characters originated from his animated shorts The Naïve Man from Lolliland and 2 in the AM PM. The series was renewed for a seventh season on July 25, 2014, ahead of its sixth-season premiere. The previous season contained 31 episodes to accommodate the film, and this season contained 39 episodes. 

The first episode of the seventh season, "Dumptown U.S.A.", aired on June 26, 2015 as a "season sneak preview". The seventh season officially premiered on August 6, 2015. Seven holdover episodes from season 6's GASB aired as part of the season.

Development

Production
The series was officially renewed for a seventh season on July 25, 2014, at the San Diego Comic-Con International event. Regular Show and Adventure Time are the first Cartoon Network series to be renewed for a seventh season. Toby Jones announced on June 21, 2015, that the previous season would only contain 31 episodes because of the production of the upcoming movie and that season seven would have 40 episodes, making "Dumptown U.S.A." the season premiere, with the rest of the season officially beginning later in the year. The writer and storyboard artists are Benton Connor, Calvin Wong, Madeline Queripel, Casey Crowe, Toby Jones, Owen Dennis, Minty Lewis, Ryan Pequin, and newcomers Sam Spina, Alex Cline, Nathan Bulmer, and Gideon Chase. For the whole season, the story writers were Quintel,  Sean Szeles, Michele Cavin, and Matt Price, who was also the story editor, while being produced by Cartoon Network Studios. It was the last season for Wong as writer/storyboard artist, as his last episode was "Win That Prize," and he became a supervising director as of the episode "Benson's Pig." It was also the last season for Jones as writer/storyboard artist, leaving the show to become the supervising director for shorts from the Cartoon Network game "OK KO!". Szeles served as supervising producer and Ryan Slater as a producer. This was the last season where John Infantino, previously the supervising director for seasons 2 through 6, wrote for the show (leaving after "The Dome Experiment Special," though "Terror Tales of the Park V" was aired out of order). This was also the last season for writer Michele Cavin (who left at the end of the season to write for Pickle and Peanut, Future-Worm!, and Amphibia). 

During a press interview by Bubbleblabber, Quintel confirmed that during the season, a special "wintery-themed" episode would air later in the year and that the season seven finale would be a half-hour special titled "Rigby's Graduation Day Special" that would change the course of the series.

Episodes

References

Regular Show seasons
2015 American television seasons
2016 American television seasons